Lawrence Garrett Mitchell (born April 5, 1995), known professionally as Cleetus McFarland, is an American racing driver, car enthusiast, novice RC pilot, and YouTube content creator.

YouTube career 
On January 28, 2009, Mitchell would start up the Cleetus McFarland YouTube channel. Around the same time, he would become the social media manager for car media company 1320Video. He eventually left 1320 to pursue a full-time career with his own YouTube channel.

In 2015, he would adopt the moniker Cleetus McFarland after the character went viral at the Rocky Mountain Drag Week.

Freedom Factory 
In January 2020, Mitchell would buy the abandoned Desoto Speedway, and would eventually rename the track to the now-called Freedom Factory.

During one of Mitchell's "Cleetus and Cars" events in November 2020, Parker Whitlock suffered third-degree burns due to a radiator hose explosion. Up until this event, drivers that entered the competition were not required to be wearing a full fire suit. During Whitlock's burnout in his bodyless Ford Mustang, a radiator hose routed past the driver exploded. Because Whitlock was only wearing a hoodie and shorts, he suffered third degree burns and required multiple skin grafts. Mitchell was later accused of safety negligence, and hiding Whitlock's injuries.

Racing career 
On April 6, 2022, it was announced on The Checkered Flag that Mitchell would make his debut in the Stadium Super Trucks at Long Beach, California, racing the No. 1776 truck. In the weekend's second of two races, he was leading on the final lap, poised to take the victory until the last jump, when he spun out after his truck hit the ground, leaving Robby Gordon to steal the victory. Another attempt came at the Music City Grand Prix in August, but he was involved in crashes in both races; the second race saw him get squeezed into the wall while racing Gavin Harlien and Robert Stout, causing him to flip onto his roof. He invited the trucks to his Bristol 1000 at Bristol Motor Speedway a month later, where he scored his first podium in Race 2 by finishing third.

On November 6, 2022, Mitchell & his crew won 1st place after eliminating Carlos Olivo in the 'MCLEOD RACING WARRIORS VS TRES CUARTO' category of the 26th Annual Haltech World Cup Finals Import & Domestic Drag Races presented by Wiseco in the 4 day event.  His Chevrolet El Camino (Le Mullet) managed an elapsed time of 6.474 seconds at a top speed of 222.95 mph on the final round of the elimination race.

Motorsports career results

Stadium Super Trucks 
(key) (Bold – Pole position. Italics – Fastest qualifier. * – Most laps led.)

 Season in progress.

References

External links 
 Official website
 

1995 births
Living people
American YouTubers
YouTube channels launched in 2009
Stadium Super Trucks drivers
Racing drivers from Nebraska
Sportspeople from Omaha, Nebraska